The Moses Morse House is a historic house in Methuen, Massachusetts, USA. It is a rare surviving farmhouse in the town with 18th century origins, with its oldest elements dating to c. 1762.  It is a 2½ story wood-frame house with a massive central chimney, and a small single story ell on the left side. The ell appears to date from near the house's original construction, and the chimney is slightly off-center, indicating the house may have been built in stages. The front door is sheltered by an elaborate Italianate portico that is a c. 1870s modification.

The house was listed on the National Register of Historic Places in 1984.

See also
 National Register of Historic Places listings in Methuen, Massachusetts
 National Register of Historic Places listings in Essex County, Massachusetts

References

Houses in Methuen, Massachusetts
Houses completed in 1762
National Register of Historic Places in Methuen, Massachusetts
Houses on the National Register of Historic Places in Essex County, Massachusetts
1762 establishments in Massachusetts